The Syracuse Blazers were a minor league professional ice hockey team that played in the Onondaga County War Memorial and State Fair Coliseum in Syracuse, New York. The team played in the Eastern Hockey League from 1967 to 1973 and the North American Hockey League from 1973 to 1977.

The Blazers won the final Walker Cup championship of the Eastern Hockey League during the 1972–73 season, compiling a 63–9–4 regular season record and beating the Roanoke Valley Rebels 4 games to 2 in the Walker Cup finals. Ray Adduono was the leading scorer on the team (54 goals, 116 assists in 76 games) and five other players scored 100 points or more. Ron Ingram was the coach and general manager on the team.

The Blazers also won the first Lockhart Cup of the North American Hockey League, compiling a 54–16–4 record and sweeping the Long Island Cougars in the playoff finals. The Blazers won the NAHL championship again in 1976–77, sweeping the Maine Nordiques in the finals.  The Blazers and the NAHL ceased operations before the start of the 1977–78 season.

Paul Newman's film Slap Shot was filmed in part at the Onondaga County War Memorial during the Blazers' 1976 season.

Season-by-season results

References

1967 establishments in New York (state)
1977 disestablishments in New York (state)
Baltimore Blades minor league affiliates
Boston Bruins minor league affiliates
Cleveland Crusaders minor league affiliates
Eastern Hockey League teams
Blazers
Jersey Knights minor league affiliates
Michigan Stags minor league affiliates
Minnesota Fighting Saints minor league affiliates
New York Golden Blades minor league affiliates
North American Hockey League (1973–1977) teams
San Diego Mariners minor league affiliates
Ice hockey clubs established in 1967
Ice hockey clubs disestablished in 1977